Callaway may refer to:

Places in the United States
Callaway, Florida
Callaway, Maryland
Callaway, Minnesota
Callaway, Missouri
Callaway, Nebraska
Callaway, Virginia
Calloway County, Kentucky
Callaway County, Missouri
Callaway Township, Minnesota
Callaway Gardens, Pine Mountain, Georgia
Callaway Nuclear Generating Station, Missouri

Other uses
Callaway (surname)
Callaway Arts & Entertainment, a publishing, licensing and animation company
Callaway Cars, automobile engineering and tuning company
Callaway Golf Company, American producer of golf sporting equipment

See also
Calaway (disambiguation)
Calloway